Tuberous Sclerosis Complex 2 (TSC2), also known as Tuberin, is a protein that in humans is encoded by the TSC2 gene.

Function 

Mutations in this gene lead to tuberous sclerosis. Its gene product is believed to be a tumor suppressor and is able to stimulate specific GTPases. Hamartin coded by the gene TSC1 functions as a facilitator of Hsp90 in chaperoning of Tuberin, therefore preventing its ubiquitination and degradation in the proteasome. Alternative splicing results in multiple transcript variants encoding different isoforms of the protein.  Mutations in TSC2 can cause Lymphangioleiomyomatosis, a disease caused by the enlargement of tissue in the lungs, creating cysts and tumours and causing difficulty breathing.  Because Tuberin regulates cell size, along with the protein Hamartin, mutations to TSC1 and TSC2 genes may prevent the control of cell growth in the lungs of individuals.

Cell Pathology

Cells from individuals with pathogenic mutations in the TSC2 gene display depletion of lysosomes, impairment of autophagy, and abnormal accumulation of glycogen. Defects in the autophagy-lysosome pathway are associated with excessive ubiquitination and degradation of LC3 and LAMP1/2 proteins.

Signaling Pathways

Pharmacological inhibition of ERK1/2 restores GSK3β activity and protein synthesis levels in a model of tuberous sclerosis.

The defective degradation of glycogen by the autophagy-lysosome pathway is, at least in part, independent of impaired regulation of mTORC1 and is restored by the combined use of PKB/Akt and mTORC1 pharmacological inhibitors.

Interactions 

TSC2 functions within a multi-protein complex knowns as the TSC complex which consists of the core proteins TSC2, TSC1, and TBC1D7.

TSC2 has been reported to interact with several other proteins that are not a part of the TSC complex including:

 AKT1, 
 AXIN1, 
 FOXO1, 
 GSK3B, 
 Hsp70 
 Hsp90 
 MAPK1, 
 PTK2, 
 PAM, 
 PRKAA1, 
 RAP1A, 
 RHEB,
 RPS6KA1, 
 UBE3A  and
 YWHAZ.

See also 
 Tuberous sclerosis protein

References

Further reading

External links 
  GeneReviews/NIH/NCBI/UW entry on Tuberous Sclerosis Complex or Bourneville Disease